is a Japanese professional drifting driver and the older brother of D1 Grand Prix driver Masao Suenaga. He currently competes in the D1 Grand Prix series for Team ORANGE. In addition to competitions, he teaches a drift school and works for Ebisu Circuit.

Complete Drifting Results

D1 Grand Prix

Sources
D1 Grand Prix
Suenaga's D1 Profile

References

Japanese racing drivers
Drifting drivers
1976 births
Living people
D1 Grand Prix drivers